Johan Brunström and Izak van der Merwe were the defending champions but van der Merwe decided not to participate.
Brunström paired up with Eric Butorac, but they lost to Steve Johnson and Bradley Klahn in the first round.
Ilija Bozoljac and Somdev Devvarman defeated Johnson and Klahn in the final 6–7(5–7), 7–6(7–3), [11–9] to win the title.

Seeds

Draw

Draw

References
 Main Draw
 Qualifying Draw

Sarasota Open - Doubles
2013 Doubles